Man Mauji is a 1962 Indian Hindi-language film starring Kishore Kumar and Sadhana in lead roles and directed by Krishnan–Panju. It was Jayalalitha's first Hindi film, in which she played Lord Krishna in a 3-minutes dance sequence with Naaz, who played Radha in the same dance program. The film was a remake of Telugu film Donga Ramudu.

Cast 
 Kishore Kumar as Raja
 Sadhana as Rani
 Pran as Jagga
 Om Prakash as Rai Sahib Bholaram
 Sulochana Chatterjee as Mrs. Bholaram
 Durga Khote as Mohan's Mother
 Leela Chitnis as Bhagwanti
 Achala Sachdev as Kamla Bai
 Mohan Choti as Seetaram
 Mukri as Darbarilal
 Anwar Hussain as Advocate
 Ashim Kumar as Dr. Mohan
 Naaz as Laxmi
 Baby Farida as Advocate's Daughter
 Master Shahid as Advocate's Son
 Sunder as Schoolmaster
 Jayalalitha as Lord Krishna

Soundtrack 
All the songs were composed by Madan Mohan and lyrics were penned by Rajinder Krishan. 

The song "Zaroorat Hai, Zaroorat Hai" sung by Kishore Kumar was a super-hit number and is still sung with comic connotation.

References 

https://m.imdb.com/title/tt0234195/fullcredits

External links 

1962 films
1960s Hindi-language films
Films directed by Krishnan–Panju
Films scored by Madan Mohan
Indian drama films
Hindi remakes of Telugu films
1962 drama films
Hindi-language drama films